Hans Nurk (15 June 1889 Tarvastu Parish, Viljandi County – 17 November 1944 Tallinn) was an Estonian politician. He was a member of Estonian Constituent Assembly.

References

1889 births
1944 deaths
Members of the Estonian Constituent Assembly